Biranit (lit. small fortress) is a military camp and former kibbutz in northern Israel on the border with Lebanon. It is the headquarters of the Galilee Division of the Israel Defense Forces, and is located around a kilometre from the Lebanese border between Sasa and Netu'a.

History

It is located on the land of the Palestinian village of Al-Mansura, which was depopulated in the 1948 Arab–Israeli War.

Biranit was planned as the hub of a group of settlements established by the Central Galilee Development Project in the 1960s. In December 1964 a Nahal group affiliated with Ha-Kibbutz HaMeuhad settled there. Its first tasks were land reclamation, afforestation, and restoration of ancient woodlands, planting of fruit orchards, road building, and other development work. Over time the settlement was abandoned, and it became a military camp.

In the 1970s a number of Katyusha rockets were fired at Biranit from Lebanese territory. On July 14, 2006, the base was hit by Katyusha rockets fired by Hezbollah during the 2006 Lebanon War.

Notable residents
Andre Spitzer (1945–1972), Israeli Olympic fencing coach killed in the Munich Massacre

References

Military installations of Israel
Nahal settlements
Ma'ale Yosef Regional Council
Buildings and structures in Northern District (Israel)